Loaded: The Best of Blake Shelton is the first greatest hits album by the American country music artist Blake Shelton. It was released on November 9, 2010, by Warner Music Group Nashville, under its Reprise label. By March 2015, the album had sold one million copies in the United States and was Shelton's fourth career album to have been certified Platinum by the RIAA.

Track listing

Charts

Weekly charts

Year-end charts

Certifications

References

2010 albums
Blake Shelton albums
Reprise Records albums
Warner Records albums